Fred Henne Territorial Park is a territorial park in the Northwest Territories of Canada, located on Long Lake near Yellowknife. It is one of 34 parks maintained by the Northwest Territories government under the Territorial Parks Act of 1988, and is also listed as a Canadian Protected Area. The Park is a termination point of the Frontier Trail and the Cameron Falls Trail. The park is named for Fred W. Henne, a former mayor of Yellowknife.

References

External links
 Official Site
 Northwest Territories Frontier Trail
 Cameron Falls Trail

Parks in the Northwest Territories
Protected areas of the Northwest Territories
Culture of Yellowknife